Yalıspor may refer to:

Trabzon Yalıspor, a sport club in Trabzon, Turkey
Maltepe Yalıspor, a sport club in Maltepe district of Istanbul, Turkey